This is a list of Civil War regiments from Maryland which fought in the Confederate States Army. The list of Maryland Union Civil War units is shown separately.

Artillery
1st Maryland Artillery, CSA (a.k.a. Dement's Artillery)
2nd Maryland Artillery, CSA (a.k.a. Baltimore Light Artillery)
3rd Maryland Artillery, CSA (a.k.a. Ritter's Battery)
4th Maryland Artillery, CSA (a.k.a. Chesapeake Battery)

Cavalry
1st Maryland Cavalry, CSA
2nd Maryland Cavalry, CSA (a.k.a. Gilmor's Partisan Rangers)

Infantry
1st Maryland Infantry, CSA
2nd Maryland Infantry, CSA

Maryland units serving in Other State's Regiments
 Zarvona's Zouaves - 47th Virginia Infantry
Also known as:
Zarvona's Independent Zouave Company,
47th VA Inf., Co. H,
Maryland Zouaves,
Zarvona's Zouaves
Maryland Guard, Co. B, 21st Virginia Infantry
Maryland Guerilla Zouaves, 2nd Co. C, Nelligan's Louisiana Infantry
1st Stuart's Horse Artillery (John Pelham Battery - a Maryland Confederate unit),  Virginia Horse Artillery

See also 

 Lists of American Civil War Regiments by State
Confederate Units by State
Maryland Line (CSA)

References

 
Maryland